Vernon station is an at-grade light rail station on the A Line of the Los Angeles Metro Rail system. The station is located in the center median of Long Beach Avenue (the historic route of the Pacific Electric Railway, and shared with the Union Pacific freight railroad's Wilmington Subdivision) at its intersection with Vernon Avenue, in South Los Angeles,  from the border with Vernon, California.

Prior to the construction of the A Line, Vernon Avenue was an important junction on the lines of the Pacific Electric. All lines from the Southern District, including the Long Beach, Watts, Whittier and San Pedro lines, stopped at Vernon Avenue, which was also a crossing with the Los Angeles Railway's V line.

Service

Station layout

Hours and frequency

Connections 
, the following connections are available:
Los Angeles Metro Bus: , 
LADOT DASH: Pueblo Del Rio, Southeast

Notable places nearby 
The station is within walking distance of the following notable places:
 Jefferson High School
 Pueblo Del Rio Housing Complex
 Fred Roberts Park
 Ross Snyder Recreation Center
 Alameda Swap Meet

References

A Line (Los Angeles Metro) stations
Railway stations in the United States opened in 1990
1990 establishments in California
Pacific Electric stations